Nurabad (also Romanized as Nūrābād; also known as Pīrāsheh and Pīr Shāh) is a village in Qarah Quyun-e Jonubi Rural District, Qarah Quyun District, Showt County, West Azerbaijan Province, Iran. At the 2006 census, its population was 285, in 71 families.

References 

Populated places in Showt County